Flabellicauda is a genus of clingfishes from the Indian Ocean and Pacific Ocean.

Species
There are currently four recognized species in this genus:
 Flabellicauda akiko  – Minute clingfish
 Flabellicauda alleni  – Allen's clingfish
 Flabellicauda bolini  – Bolin's clingfish 
 Flabellicauda cometes  – Comet's clingfish

References

Ray-finned fish genera
Gobiesocidae